The union of Hungary and Romania comprises proposed unsuccessful 20th-century mostly interbellum attempts to unite the Kingdom or Republic of Hungary with the Kingdom of Romania. Such proposals were most active in 1919 and 1920, though they had appeared somewhat earlier and continued up to World War II.

Proposals
The proposed union would have been ruled by the Romanian Hohenzollern-Sigmaringen dynasty. The project saw support and opposition on both the Romanian and Hungarian sides.

Reasons for Romania to favor the project included potential expansion of Romania's influence nearer to Vienna, increased security of Romania's western border, reduced chances of Hungary taking Transylvania back from Romania and prevention of the Habsburgs returning to power in Hungary.

Hungary's reasons to favor the proposed union were prevention of Hungary's political isolation and Hungarian hopes for getting back Transylvania, or at least securing autonomy for Transylvania's Hungarian minority. As an inducement for Hungary to accept the proposed union, Romania offered to support Hungary in defending its western territories against Austria, and to help Hungary get back Slovakia and Hungary's former southern territories.

Every proposal for union failed because of opposition in Hungary and Romania, as well as opposition from other countries, particularly Serbia and later Yugoslavia, Czechoslovakia and the Entente powers.

See also
 Hungary–Romania relations
 List of proposed state mergers
 Transylvanianism
 Union of Bulgaria and Romania
 Union of Hungary and Poland

References

External links
 

Hungary–Romania relations
Federalism by country
Modern history of Hungary
Modern history of Romania
Political history of Hungary
Political history of Romania
Proposed political unions
Proposals in Hungary
Proposals in Romania